The Critics' Choice Television Award for Best Movie/Limited Series is one of the award categories presented annually by the Critics' Choice Television Awards (BTJA). It was introduced in 2012. The winners are selected by a group of television critics that are part of the Broadcast Television Critics Association. In 2014, the category was split, due to the amount of entries for both.

Winners and nominees

2010s

2020s

See also
 Primetime Emmy Award for Outstanding Limited Series
 Primetime Emmy Award for Outstanding Television Movie
 Golden Globe Award for Best Miniseries or Television Film
 Primetime Emmy Award for Outstanding Miniseries or Movie
 TCA Award for Outstanding Achievement in Movies, Miniseries and Specials

References

External links
 

Critics' Choice Television Awards